Euroformat Kyiv has a professional beach soccer team based in Kyiv, Ukraine. Prior to 2011, Euroformat was called New Era. The club was organized by company Euroformat.

Honours

Ukrainian competitions
Ukrainian Beach Soccer Premier League
 Winners: 2004, 2005, 2007, 2011

International competitions

Notable former players
  Andriy Borsuk

External links
  Ukrainian Beach Soccer Association Official website
  Beach soccer on the FFU
  Profile on Kyiv Beach Soccer League

Sport in Kyiv
Ukrainian beach soccer clubs